Al-Muharram is a sub-district located in Al Makhadir District, Ibb Governorate, Yemen. Al-Muharram had a population of  2434 as of 2004.

References 

Sub-districts in Al Makhadir District